Bill Barisoff is a former BC Liberal Member of the Legislative Assembly in the Province of British Columbia, Canada.  Born in Oliver, he was an MLA from 1996 until 2013, representing the districts of Okanagan-Boundary, Penticton-Okanagan Valley and Penticton over the course of his career.

Before entering politics, he owned a trucking firm.

Bill Barisoff served as Speaker of the House from September 12, 2005, until his retirement. He previously served as Minister of Water, Land and Air Protection and Minister of Provincial Revenue.

References

Year of birth missing (living people)
Living people
Speakers of the Legislative Assembly of British Columbia
British Columbia Liberal Party MLAs
Members of the Executive Council of British Columbia
People from Oliver, British Columbia
21st-century Canadian politicians